DC Universe: The Stories of Alan Moore is a 2006 trade paperback collection of comic books written by Alan Moore for DC Comics from 1985 to 1988, published by Titan Books. This collection is a replacement for the earlier Across the Universe: The Stories of Alan Moore which contained all of the same stories except for "Whatever Happened to the Man of Tomorrow?" and The Killing Joke.

Stories

"For the Man Who Has Everything"

Originally appeared in Superman Annual #11 (1985)
Artist: Dave Gibbons
Colorist: Tom Ziuko
Letterer: Dave Gibbons

"Night Olympics"
Originally appeared in Detective Comics #549-550 (April–May 1985)
Artist: Klaus Janson
Letterer: Todd Klein

"Mogo Doesn't Socialize"

Originally appeared in Green Lantern #188 (May 1985)
Artist: Dave Gibbons
Colorist: Anthony Tollin
Letterer: Todd Klein

"Father's Day"
Originally appeared in Vigilante #17-18 (May–June 1985)
Artist: Jim Baikie
Colorist: Tatjana Wood
Letterer: Annie Halfacree

"Brief Lives"
Originally appeared in The Omega Men #26 (May 1985)
Artist: Kevin O'Neill
Colorist: Carl Gafford
Letterer: Todd Klein

"A Man's World"
Originally appeared in The Omega Men #27 (June 1985)
Penciller: Paris Cullins
Inker: Rick Magyar
Colorist: Carl Gafford
Letterer: Todd Klein

"The Jungle Line"
Originally appeared in DC Comics Presents #85 (September 1985)
Penciller: Rick Veitch
Inker: Al Williamson
Colorist: Tatjana Wood
Letterer: John Costanza

"Tygers"
Originally appeared in Tales of the Green Lantern Corps Annual #2 (1986)
Artist: Kevin O'Neill
Colorist: Anthony Tollin
Letterer: John Costanza

"Whatever Happened to the Man of Tomorrow?"

Originally appeared in Superman #423 and Action Comics #583 (September 1986)
Artist: Curt Swan and George Pérez (Superman)
Curt Swan and Kurt Schaffenberger (Action Comics)
Original Colorist: Gene D'Angelo
Recolored by Tom McCraw
Letterer: Todd Klein

"Footsteps"
Originally appeared in Secret Origins #10 (January 1987)
Artist: Joe Orlando
Colorist: Carl Gafford
Letterer: Bob Lappan

"Mortal Clay"
Originally appeared in Batman Annual #11 (July 1987)
Artist: George Freeman
Colorist: Lovern Kindzierski
Letterer: John Costanza

"In Blackest Night"
Originally appeared in Tales of the Green Lantern Corps Annual #3 (August 1987)
Penciller: Bill Willingham
Inker: Terry Austin
Colorist: Gene D'Angelo
Letterer: John Costanza

"The Killing Joke"

Originally appeared as Batman: The Killing Joke OGN (1988)
Artist: Brian Bolland
Colorist: John Higgins
Letterer: Richard Starkings

See also
Alan Moore bibliography

References

DC Universe: The Stories of Alan Moore table of contents

Comics by Alan Moore
Superhero comics
DC Comics titles